Tierra del Fuego Igneous and Metamorphic Complex is a geological basement complex known from boreholes in northern Tierra del Fuego. The complex is made up of foliated igneous rocks of Cambrian age including orthogneiss. It underlies unconformably the Jurassic Tobífera Formation. The protoliths of Cordillera Darwin Metamorphic Complex are unrelated to Tierra del Fuego Igneous and Metamorphic Complex despite present-day proximity.

References 

Cambrian Argentina
Cambrian Chile
Geology of Magallanes Region
Metamorphic complexes
Lithodemic units of Argentina
Lithodemic units of Chile